"New Year's Eve" is a song by American hip hop recording artist Snoop Dogg, released November 5, 2010, as a promotional single, which was originally from his eleventh studio album Doggumentary recordings but did not make the final track list. The song features American singer-songwriter Marty James.

Music video
The video was filmed on November 8, 2010 during his wife's birthday party. The video was released on November 12, 2010 and is directed by Pook Brown. It features appearances from DJ Quik, Mike Epps and Kokane.

Track listing 
 Digital single

Charts

References

2010 singles
2010 songs
Snoop Dogg songs
Songs written by Snoop Dogg
Song recordings produced by Scoop DeVille
Capitol Records singles
New Year songs